Helen Rodríguez Trías (July 7, 1929 – December 27, 2001) was an American pediatrician, educator and women's rights activist. She was the first Latina president of the American Public Health Association (APHA), a founding member of the Women's Caucus of the APHA, and a recipient of the Presidential Citizens Medal. She is credited with helping to expand the range of public health services for women and children in minority and low-income populations around the world.

Early years 
Rodríguez Trías's parents moved to New York City from Puerto Rico in the early part of the 20th century. After Rodríguez Trías's birth in 1929, her family moved back to Puerto Rico but returned to New York in 1939. Rodriguez-Trias chose medicine because it "combined the things I loved the most, science and people". In New York, Rodríguez Trías experienced racism and discrimination. In school, she was placed in a class with students with learning disabilities, even though she had good grades and knew how to speak English. After she participated in a poem recital, her teacher realized that she was a gifted child and sent her to a class with gifted children.

Puerto Rican independence activist 
Rodríguez Trías's mother was a school teacher in Puerto Rico. However, in New York, she was unable to get a teacher's license. Therefore, her mother had to take in boarders to meet her financial needs and pay the rent. After Rodríguez Trías graduated from high school, she decided she would like to study medicine and that her chances would be much better in Puerto Rico because the island had a good scholarship system.

In 1948, she began her academic education at the University of Puerto Rico in San Juan. The university had a very strong independence movement and Rodríguez Trías became involved with the student faction of the Puerto Rican Nationalist Party. Nationalist leader Don Pedro Albizu Campos was invited to speak by the student council; however, the chancellor of the university, Jaime Rexach Benítez, did not permit Albizu access to the campus. The students consequently went on strike, with Rodríguez Trías amongst them, but her brother did not approve of this. He threatened to cut off her college expenses and she returned to New York.

In New York, she got married and had three children before she decided to return to Puerto Rico to pursue her degree. At the University of Puerto Rico, she became a student activist on issues such as freedom of speech and Puerto Rican independence. She earned her BA degree in 1957 and entered UPR's school of medicine. She earned her medical degree in 1960, at the age of 31, and soon after gave birth to her fourth child. During her residency at the University Hospital in San Juan, she established the first center for the care of newborn babies in Puerto Rico. The hospital's death rate for newborns decreased 50 percent within three years. She established her medical practice in the field of pediatrics in the island after completing her residency. During this timeframe she divorced her husband and in 1970 returned to New York. She said that her marriage and divorce helped her grow.

Medical career 

Rodríguez Trías headed the department of pediatrics at Lincoln Hospital in the South Bronx. At Lincoln Hospital, Rodríguez Trías lobbied to give all workers a voice in administrative and patient-care issues. She became involved with the Puerto Rican community and encouraged the health care workers at the hospital to become aware of the cultural issues and needs of the community. Rodríguez Trías was also an associate professor of medicine at Albert Einstein College of Medicine, Yeshiva University, and later taught at Columbia and Fordham universities.

Advocate for women's rights 

During her years in Puerto Rico, Rodríguez Trías became aware that unsuspecting Puerto Rican women were being sterilized and that the United States was using Puerto Rico as a laboratory for the development of birth control technology. In 1970, she was a founding member of Committee to End Sterilization Abuse and in 1971 a founding member of the Women's Caucus of the American Public Health Association. She supported abortion rights, fought for the abolishment of enforced sterilization, and sought neonatal care for underserved people. In 1979, she became a founding member of the Committee for Abortion Rights and Against Sterilization Abuse and testified before the Department of Health, Education, and Welfare for passage of federal sterilization guidelines. She describes events at a 1974 Boston conference:

The guidelines, which she drafted, required a woman's written consent to sterilization in a language they could understand and set a waiting period between the consent and the sterilization procedure. She is credited with helping to expand the range of public health services for women and children in minority and low-income populations in the United States, Central and South America, Africa, Asia, and the Middle East.

In the 1980s, Rodríguez Trías served as medical director of the New York State Department of Health AIDS Institute. She worked on behalf of women from minority groups who were infected with HIV. In the 1990s, she served as health co-director of the Pacific Institute for Women's Health, a nonprofit research and advocacy group dedicated to improving women's well-being worldwide and focused on reproduction. She was a founding member of both the Women's Caucus and the Hispanic Caucus of the American Public Health Association (APHA) and the first Latina to serve as the president of the APHA.

Later years 
Rodríguez Trías once stated that her biggest inspiration came from "the experience of [her] own mother, aunts and sisters, who faced so many restraints in their struggle to flourish and realize their full potential". In addition to her mother, was Dr. Jose Sifontes, a professor at her medical school, who was a pioneer in pediatric tuberculosis. According to Rodríguez Trías, Dr. Jose Sifontes had great awareness that the events occurring in a community do affect the health of that community. These were some of the notable mentors who inspired Rodríguez Trías as she grew to become a huge contributor to the field of science.

On January 8, 2001, President Bill Clinton awarded Rodríguez Trías with the Presidential Citizen's Medal, the second-highest civilian award in the United States, for her work on behalf of women, children, people with HIV and AIDS, and poor people. Later that year, on December 27, Rodríguez Trías died of cancer.

On July 7, 2018, which would have been Rodríguez Trías' 89th birthday, Google featured her in a Google Doodle in the United States.

In 2019, Chirlane McCray announced that New York City would build a statue honoring Rodríguez Trías in St. Mary's Park, near Lincoln Hospital in the Bronx.

Overall, Rodríguez Trías leaves behind a legacy that can be explained with her own words:

See also 

 History of women in Puerto Rico
List of Puerto Ricans
List of Puerto Rican scientists and inventors
Puerto Rican Nationalist Party
List of Puerto Rican Presidential Citizens Medal recipients

Notes

References

External links 

 The White House – President Clinton Awards the Presidential Citizens Medals

1929 births
2001 deaths
Physicians from New York City
Puerto Rican women scientists
Puerto Rican activists
20th-century Puerto Rican educators
Puerto Rican pediatricians
Women pediatricians
Members of the Puerto Rican Nationalist Party
Puerto Rican independence activists
Presidential Citizens Medal recipients
20th-century American women scientists
20th-century American scientists